Emese Hunyady (born 4 March 1966) is a former Hungarian-Austrian speed skater.

At age ten, Hunyady participated at the 1977 Hungarian Sprint Championships for Juniors, finishing sixth. Representing Hungary, she had her first international competition in 1979, and in the following years, although still a junior, she entered several senior tournaments. In 1985, after marrying her Austrian coach Tamás Németh, she obtained Austrian citizenship, and started competing for Austria. The marriage was dissolved some years later, but she retained her Austrian citizenship.

During her 25-year-long career, she was a steady performer, almost always finishing in the top 10 of the events she participated in. Her best year was 1994, when she won bronze at the European Allround Championships, became World Allround Champion, won the 1500 m World Cup, and became Olympic Champion in the 1500 m, while winning Olympic silver in the 3000 m. After that, her successes became fewer, but in 1999, she surprisingly won the World Single Distance Championships in her favourite distance, the 1500 m.

Hunyady participated in six Winter Olympics from 1984 to 2002, and won many Hungarian and Austrian National Allround, Sprint, and Single Distance Championships. She started her sporting career in figure skating, something she used to show when celebrating her victories as a speed skater.

Hunyady is married to Timo Järvinen, a former speed skater from Finland. They have a son, Jasper.

Medals
An overview of medals won by Hunyady at important championships she participated in, listing the years in which she won each:

World records
Over the course of her career, Hunyady skated one world record:

Personal records
To put these personal records in perspective, the last column (WR) lists the official world records on the dates that Hunyady skated her personal records.

Hunyady has an Adelskalender score of 162.320 points. Her highest position on the Adelskalender was a third place.

See also
 List of athletes with the most appearances at Olympic Games

References

External links
Emese Hunyady at SkateResults.com
Personal records from Jakub Majerski's Speedskating Database
Evert Stenlund's Adelskalender pages
Emese Hunyady. Deutsche Eisschnelllauf Gemeinschaft e.V. (German Skating Association).
Athlete profile: Emese Hunyady. CNN/SI (1998-02-03). Retrieved on 2007-09-02.
Historical World Records. International Skating Union (2007-06-12). Retrieved on 2007-09-02.
National Championships results. Magyar Országos Korcsolyázó Szövetség (Hungarian National Skating Federation). Retrieved on 2007-09-02.
Photos and facts of Emese Hunyady. Deutsche Eisschnelllauf Gemeinschaft e.V. (German Skating Association). Retrieved on 2007-09-02.

1966 births
Living people
Austrian female speed skaters
Hungarian female speed skaters
Speed skaters at the 1984 Winter Olympics
Speed skaters at the 1988 Winter Olympics
Speed skaters at the 1992 Winter Olympics
Speed skaters at the 1994 Winter Olympics
Speed skaters at the 1998 Winter Olympics
Speed skaters at the 2002 Winter Olympics
Olympic speed skaters of Austria
Olympic speed skaters of Hungary
Medalists at the 1992 Winter Olympics
Medalists at the 1994 Winter Olympics
Olympic medalists in speed skating
Olympic gold medalists for Austria
Olympic silver medalists for Austria
Olympic bronze medalists for Austria
Austrian people of Hungarian descent
Speed skaters from Budapest
World Allround Speed Skating Championships medalists